The 2024 ICC Men's T20 World Cup will be the ninth ICC Men's T20 World Cup, an international Twenty20 cricket tournament. It is scheduled to be played in June 2024 in the West Indies  and will be the first ICC World Cup tournament to feature matches played in the United States. England are the defending champions, having won the previous edition.

Host selection
In November 2021, the International Cricket Council (ICC) announced that the 2024 Men's T20 World Cup would be played in the West Indies and the United States. A joint bid was submitted by Cricket West Indies and USA Cricket following two years of preparation, forming part of a strategic partnership between the two associations.

In October 2022, it was reported that the ICC had stripped USA Cricket of its role as administrative co-host of the World Cup due to continued non-compliance with the ICC's financial protocols and concerns being raised over USA Cricket's financial position, including debts of approximately $650,000. This was not expected to impact the playing of matches in the country.

Format
The 20 qualifying teams will be divided into four groups of five, from which the top two teams in each group advance to the Super 8 round. In this stage, the qualifying teams will be split in two groups of four; the top two teams from each group will qualify for the knockout stage, which will consist of two semi-finals and a final.

Teams and qualifications
The top eight teams from the 2022 tournament, along with the two hosts, the West Indies and the United States, qualified automatically for the tournament. The remaining automatic qualification places (to give 12 teams in total) were taken by the best-ranked teams in the ICC Men's T20I Team Rankings, as of 14 November 2022, who had not already secured a place in the finals.

As the United States and West Indies did not finish in the top eight of the 2022 tournament, this meant the two highest-ranked unqualified teams from the ICC rankings advanced to the 2024 edition; had either host finished in the top eight, their slot would have been passed down to the next best-ranked unqualified teams as required. The eight remaining places will be filled via the ICC's regional qualifiers, comprising the top two teams from Africa, Asia, and Europe, along with one team each from the Americas and the East Asia-Pacific groups. In May 2022, the ICC confirmed the sub-regional qualification pathways for Europe, East Asia-Pacific, and Africa.

Group Stage 
<onlyinclude>

Group A 

 Advance to Super 8s

Group B 

 Advance to Super 8s

Group C 

 Advance to Super 8s

Group D 

 Advance to Super 8s

Super 8s 

Seedings for this stage will be allocated at the start of the tournament and may not be affected by group stage results, with the exception that if a non-seeded team knocks out a seeded team, it can inherit that team's seeding.

Group 1 
<onlyinclude>
 Advance to Knockout Stage

Group 2 
<onlyinclude>
 Advance to Knockout Stage

Knockout Stage

Semi-finals

Final

References

ICC Men's T20 World Cup 2024
June 2024 sports events in North America